Philip Charles Ruffles  is a British aerospace engineer. Born in October 1939, he graduated from the University of Bristol with a first class degree in mechanical engineering in 1961. He joined Rolls-Royce plc, becoming director of engineering and technology from 1997 until his retirement in 2001. He is an advisor to Bladon Jets.
He was a non-executive director of Domino Printing Sciences plc.

Honours and awards
1998 Fellow of the Royal Society

2001 Commander of the Most Excellent Order of the British Empire

2001 Prince Philip Medal

2011 Richard Glazebrook Medal and Prize of the Institute of Physics

Royal Aeronautical Society Gold Medal

Fellow of the Royal Academy of Engineering

MacRobert Award of the Royal Academy of Engineering

References

British aerospace engineers
Rolls-Royce people
Commanders of the Order of the British Empire
Fellows of the Royal Academy of Engineering
Fellows of the Royal Society
Living people
Year of birth missing (living people)